Kamakshi Devi Temple is a Hindu temple dedicated to mother goddess Kamakshi, a form of Shakti. It is located in the village  Kamasin in Pratapgarh district of the North Indian state Uttar Pradesh.

See also 
Nandmahar Dham
Mata Mawai Dham
Durgan Dham Temple

References

Shakti temples
Hindu temples in Pratapgarh district, Uttar Pradesh